Helene Emma Madison (June 19, 1913 – November 27, 1970) was an American competition swimmer, Olympic champion, and former world record-holder.

Madison won three gold medals in freestyle event at the 1932 Summer Olympics in Los Angeles, becoming, along with Romeo Neri of Italy, the most successful athlete at the 1932 Olympics: women's 100-meter freestyle, 400-meter freestyle, and 4×100-meter freestyle relay.

In sixteen months in 1930 and 1931, she broke sixteen world records in various distances. Following the 1932 Olympics she appeared in the films The Human Fish and The Warrior's Husband and hence, as a professional, was not allowed to participate in the 1936 Summer Olympics in Berlin.  After her swimming career, she had odd jobs as a swimming instructor, department store clerk and a nurse.

Personal life 
Madison had one child, Helene Madison Ware, who at one time lived in Marysville, Washington.  Divorced three times and living alone, she died of throat cancer in 1970 in Seattle, Washington.

Hall of fame 
She was inducted into the International Swimming Hall of Fame in 1966, and the U.S. Olympic Hall of Fame in 1992.

See also
 List of members of the International Swimming Hall of Fame
 List of multiple Olympic gold medalists
 List of Olympic medalists in swimming (women)
 World record progression 100 metres freestyle
 World record progression 200 metres freestyle
 World record progression 400 metres freestyle
 World record progression 800 metres freestyle
 World record progression 1500 metres freestyle
 World record progression 4 × 100 metres freestyle relay

References

External links

 
 
 

1913 births
1970 deaths
American female freestyle swimmers
Deaths from cancer in Washington (state)
Deaths from esophageal cancer
World record setters in swimming
Olympic gold medalists for the United States in swimming
Swimmers from Seattle
Swimmers at the 1932 Summer Olympics
Medalists at the 1932 Summer Olympics
20th-century American women
20th-century American people